The Vasas SC water polo team is a department of the Budapest-based sports association Vasas SC. One of the most successful teams in the country, they have won the Hungarian Championship 17 times and the Hungarian Cup 15 times. The club also had major successes on continental level as they won the LEN Euroleague (formerly European  Champions Cup), Europe's premier water polo competition two times and took the LEN Cup Winners' Cup title on three occasions as well.

Starting from the 2010–11 season, the club is officially known as TEVA-Vasas-UNIQA due to sponsorship reasons.

Naming history
 Vasas Sport Club (Vasas SC): (1945 – 1949)
 Budapesti Vasas (Bp. Vasas): (1950 – 1956)
 Vasas SC: (1957 – 1990/91)
 Vasas SC-Plaket: (1991/92 – 2001/02) - the first naming sponsor of Vasas
 Vasas-Plaket-Euroleasing: (2002/03 – 2003/04)
 TEVA-VasasPlaket: (2004/05 – 2009/10)
 TEVA-Vasas-UNIQA: (2010/11 – 2011/12)
 TEVA-Vasas: (2012/13)
 LACTIV-VasasPlaket: (2013/14)
 VasasPlaket: (2014/15 – 2019/20)
 A-Híd VasasPlaket: (2020/21 – ... )

Honours

Domestic competitions 
Országos Bajnokság I (National Championship of Hungary)
 Champions (18): 1947, 1949, 1953, 1975, 1976, 1977, 1979, 1980, 1981, 1982, 1983, 1984, 1988–89, 2006–07, 2007–08, 2008–09, 2009–10, 2011–12

Magyar Kupa (National Cup of Hungary)
 Winners (15): 1947, 1961, 1971, 1981, 1983, 1984, 1991–92, 1993–94, 1995–96, 1997, 2000–01, 2001–02, 2004, 2005, 2009

Szuperkupa (Super Cup of Hungary); 
 Winners: 2001, 2006

European competitions 
LEN Champions League (Champions Cup)
Winners (2): 1979–80, 1984–85

LEN Cup Winners' Cup
Winners (3): 1985–86, 1994–95, 2001–02

LEN Super Cup
Winners (1): 1985

Current squad
Season 2022–23

Staff
Technical staff
 Head Coach:  Slobodan Nikić
 Assistant and Goalkeeping Coach:  Csaba Mátéfalvy
 Club Doctor:  Dr. Attila Szűcs
 Masseur:  Ákos Horváth
 Fitness Coach:  Marcell Fridvalszki
 Video Analyst:  Balázs Búza
 Team Manager:  Szabolcs Tóth

Management
 Department Leader:  Zoltán Apáthy

Transfers

Recent seasons

 Cancelled due to the COVID-19 pandemic in Hungary.

In European competition
Participations in Champions League (Champions Cup, Euroleague): 19x
Participations in Euro Cup (LEN Cup): 3x
Participations in Cup Winners' Cup: 7x

Notable former players

Olympic champions

  Jenő Brandi (1945–1949)
  Antal Bolvári (1962–1963)
  Mihály Bozsi (1948)
  Gábor Csapó (1973–1984)
  Tamás Faragó (1969–1984)
  Norbert Hosnyánszky (2006–2007, 2008–2010)
  László Jeney (1945–1955)
  Tamás Kásás (2003–2004)
  György Kenéz (1974–1985)
  Gábor Kis (2008–2010)
  Gergely Kiss (2010–2012)
  Zoltán Kósz (1976–1997, 2001–2004)
  Norbert Madaras (2001–2004)
  Kálmán Markovits (1950–1962)
  István Molnár (1945–1947)
  Péter Rusorán (1969–1972)
  Ádám Steinmetz (2000–2008, 2011–2018)
  Barnabás Steinmetz (2003–2009, 2010–2012)
  Bulcsú Székely (2001–2002)
  István Szívós (1945–1946, 1949–1956)
  Attila Vári (1994–2002)
  Dániel Varga (2001–2010)
  Dénes Varga (2005–2010)
  Tamás Varga (1994–1996, 2000–2004)
  Miho Bošković (2010–2012)
  Branislav Mitrović (2020–)
  Slobodan Nikić (2019–2020)
  Sava Ranđelović (2020–)

Former coaches

 Mihály Bozsi (1947–1956)
 István Szívós (1957–1959)

 Mihály Bozsi (1962–1965) 

 Dezső Gyarmati (1971–1972)
 Péter Rusorán (1973–1976)

 Péter Rusorán (1979–1981) 

 Péter Rusorán (1983–1986) 
 Dezső Gyarmati (1988) 
 György Kenéz (1988–1990)
 Gábor Csapó (1992–1993)

 Tamás Faragó (1995–2000)
 József Somossy (2000–2003)
 Zoltán Kásás (2003–2004)
 László Földi (2004– present)

References

External links
 

Water polo
Sport in Budapest
Sports clubs established in 1945
Water polo clubs in Hungary
1945 establishments in Hungary

de:Vasas Budapest#Wasserball
es:Budapesti Vasas Sport Club#Waterpolo
it:Vasas Sport Club#Pallanuoto maschile